Newcastle Civic Centre is a local government building located in the Haymarket area of Newcastle upon Tyne, England. It is the main administrative and ceremonial centre for Newcastle City Council. Designed by the city architect, George Kenyon, the building was completed in 1967 and was formally opened by King Olav V of Norway on 14 November 1968.

History 

Plans to build a new city hall on the site at Barras Bridge had been proposed prior to the outbreak of the Second World War, to the point of holding an architectural competition, although these were halted by the war; and due to post-war restrictions on capital expenditure, it was not until August 1956 that authorisation to begin construction was granted. During the interim period, the demolition of houses and a former Eye Hospital on the intended site was implemented. The building was designed by the city architect, George Kenyon.

The construction work, which was undertaken by Sir Robert McAlpine, commenced on the building in May 1960, and the foundation stone was laid by the Lord Mayor, Alderman Mrs Gladys Robson, on 30 November 1960. The building was completed in 1967 and was formally opened by King Olav V of Norway on 14 November 1968. The total construction cost was £4,855,000. Newcastle's Victorian Town Hall which stood in St Nicholas Square (between the Bigg Market and the Cloth Market) was demolished in 1973.  On 6 May 1977, the Civic Centre was visited by the 39th President of the United States Jimmy Carter, who delivered a speech famously containing the Geordie phrase "Howay the lads!" A stone commemorating the event was placed in the Civic Centre grounds.

The council leader's office was used as a filming location by a Japanese production team in 2014 for a drama set in 1960s Tokyo.

Sculpture and art works 
The Civic Centre is also notable for its modern sculptures, in particular the "River God Tyne" and "Swans in Flight", both by David Wynne and the seahorses on the top of the tower by John Robert Murray McCheyne. The cashiers reception of the former rates hall, now the Customer Service Centre, has two abstract murals by Victor Pasmore.

See also
 List of carillons of the British Isles

References

External links 

 Official website

City and town halls in Tyne and Wear
Government buildings completed in 1967
Buildings and structures in Newcastle upon Tyne
Grade II* listed buildings in Tyne and Wear